Wikification may refer to:
 the application of wiki markup to text
 in computer science, entity linking with Wikipedia as the target knowledge base